Solstice is an album by the American guitarist Ralph Towner that was released on the ECM label in 1975. It features Towner with Jan Garbarek, Eberhard Weber and Jon Christensen.

The 1977 album, Solstice/Sound and Shadows, was released by Towner on ECM with the same quartet.

Reception
Allmusic awarded the album with 4.5 stars and its review by Michael G. Nastos states: "Of the many excellent recordings he has offered, Solstice is Towner's crowning achievement as a leader fronting this definitive grouping of ECM stablemates who absolutely define the label's sound for the time frame, and for all time".

Track listing
All compositions by Ralph Towner except where noted.

"Oceanus" – 11:04
"Visitation" – 2:36
"Drifting Petals" – 7:01
"Nimbus" – 6:31
"Winter Solstice" – 4:02
"Piscean Dance" – 4:15
"Red and Black" – 1:19
"Sand" (Eberhard Weber) – 4:10

Personnel
Ralph Towner – 12-string and classical guitar, piano
Jan Garbarek – tenor and soprano saxophone, flute
Eberhard Weber – bass, cello
Jon Christensen – drums, percussion

Sampling
The American hip hop group Atmosphere used a sample of Jon Christensen's drum introduction to "Piscean Dance" on a track called "Shoes", which features on their 2003 album Seven's Travels.

References

1975 albums
ECM Records albums
Ralph Towner albums
Albums produced by Manfred Eicher